Race Across the World is a British television competition programme, in which teams of two race across an area of the world in order to become the fastest to reach a destination using any means of transportation other than air travel. The programme was broadcast on BBC Two for the first two series, but due to better than expected viewership moved to BBC One for the third series. It has been narrated by John Hannah since first airing in 2019.

The first series, consisting of six episodes, was aired from 3 March to 7 April 2019. On 9 July 2019, the BBC confirmed that a second and third series had been commissioned. In a further announcement on 3 October 2019, it was revealed that a celebrity spin-off series was also in the works, but production was delayed due to the COVID-19 pandemic. The second series consisted of nine episodes, with the opening episode broadcast on 8 March 2020. In September 2022, the BBC announced the third series, which is set wholly within Canada and a move to BBC One.

Format
The programme follows pairs of competitors racing around the world to be the first to reach the final destination. In the first series, the race started from London and finished in Singapore. The competitors cannot fly but are each given an amount of money equivalent to the price of a one-way plane ticket to the final destination, which they can use to travel by land or by sea. The funds can be used to pay for the cost of any travel including food and accommodation, but teams may also work to earn more money along the way. The competitors are not allowed any mobile electronic devices or credit cards at the start of the race, but are given a world map, a GPS device to track their progress and for safety as well as finding the checkpoints, and a travel guide with local job adverts, in addition to the money. In every episode, the teams are given a checkpoint they have to reach. One team may be eliminated if they come last at a pre-determined checkpoint. At each checkpoint, the racers are given a 36-hour break. The first team to reach the final destination is awarded the cash prize of £20,000.

Production
Before the race, two assistant producers conducted a recce research trip to assess the feasibility of such a journey within the budget constraints. All likely bus and train journeys were assessed beforehand. Visas were applied for the countries along all possible routes before the race as well as any necessary vaccinations required for entry to these countries.

During the race, each team had two film crew members who travelled along with them. All decisions, however, were made by the racers and the crew cannot interfere with their choices. A director of photography travelled behind the teams for additional location filming. To ensure the safety of the racers, there may be local fixers and security advisers who observed the racers from a distance, and a medical support vehicle also travelled an hour behind the teams in some countries.

The programme was commissioned by David Brindley and Michael Jochnowitz for BBC Two.

Series overview

Series 1 (2019) 

The first series of Race Across the World consisting of six episodes first aired on BBC Two from 3 March to 7 April 2019. Five pairs of racers travelled from the Old Royal Naval College in Greenwich, London and finished at the Marina Bay Sands hotel in Singapore. The itinerary of the race covered countries in Europe and Asia with checkpoints in Greece, Azerbaijan, Uzbekistan, China and Cambodia. In the first series, the contestants were each given £1,329 for the whole race, a journey of 12,000 miles which was completed in 50 days.

The first series featured five pairs of competitors at the start of the race: Natalie and Shameema, Jinda and Bindu, Darron and Alex, Josh and Felix, and Sue and Clare. Jinda and Bindu withdrew due to family illness in the first episode, and were replaced by Elaine and Tony, while Sue and Clare were eliminated in the second episode. The winners were Elaine and Tony.

The series was the most successful debut for a factual entertainment show on BBC Two in over three years, and one of the most-watched shows of the year for the channel.

Series 2 (2020)

A second series began airing on 8 March 2020 with five teams setting off from Chapultepec Castle in Mexico City in a race to the most southerly city in the world, Ushuaia in Argentina, covering a distance of 25,000 km in 2 months, passing through 7 checkpoints in Honduras, Panama, Colombia, Peru, Bolivia, Brazil, and Chile.  Each team was given £1,453 for the entire trip, equating to roughly £26 per day. Filming started in September 2019.

In this series, the no-fly rule was abandoned due to civil unrest in Ecuador which made land travel through the country unsafe - all the teams were flown from Colombia to Peru to continue the race. The 5 teams of racers were Dom & Lizzie, Jo & Sam, Jen & Rob, Shuntelle & Michael, and Emon and Jamiul. No one was eliminated in this series but two teams decided to quit; Shuntelle & Michael left after losing half of their money in leg 2 of the race, while Jo & Sam withdrew after they had run out of money in leg 7.  The winners were Emon and Jamiul who beat Jen & Rob to the final checkpoint by seconds.

The number of episodes increased from six to nine this series; eight episodes on the race followed by a reunion special.

Series 3 (2023)

On 28 September 2022, the BBC announced that a third series of Race Across the World would enter production by the end of the year, which will be set wholly within Canada with a route from Vancouver, British Columbia to St. John's, Newfoundland and Labrador. The programme will also move from BBC Two to BBC One.

In a subsequent press release dated 15 March 2023, the BBC revealed the five pairs of competitors as Cathie and Tricia, Claudia and Kevin, Ladi and Monique, Marc and Michael, Mobeen, and Zainib. In a move from its previous Sunday evening broadcast to a midweek timeslot, the air date for the first episode of the third series was confirmed as 22 March 2023. Once again the series is comprised of nine episodes; eight episodes on the race followed by a reunion special.

Reception
Race Across the World has received generally positive reviews mixed with some negative reviews.  Michael Hogan of The Telegraph found the first series "fiendishly addictive", and thought that it "reaffirmed one's faith in human nature" where friendships are "formed across cultural divides", with the series ending on an act of kindness that was "apt" and "heartwarming". Jeff Robson of the i newspaper regarded the series as "flawed but engaging", and that although the show lacked the "challenges of some extreme travelogues, nor the sense of peril", it "succeeded in recreating the combination of unexpected highlights, soul-destroying lows and crucial budget decisions which characterised old-school seat of the pants travel". Carol Midgley of The Times regarded the challenge of racing to be "quite tough" and "dramatic".

In the second series, Joel Golby of The Guardian judged it "an astounding piece of TV" that "captures all the vibrant highs and exhausted lows of travel in all of their raw glory", and one that made him "genuinely caring how this one ends and the impact it will have on the lives of those who lived it". Anita Singh of The Telegraph thought "the casting is one of the strengths of the series" and she "can't help but warm to these wacky racers", however, Chris Moss of the same paper was more negative; he found that the obstacles the contestants faced were "largely fictive" and the tension "fabricated", and thought the show used the "old idiot abroad trope", and the viewers were "asked not to marvel at faraway places but to engage with the participants". Equally negative was Barry Didcock of The Herald who considered the show's premise of travelling without flying "a frivolous exercise" and of questionable taste as the budget of racers would exceed that of a refugee at the Mexico-Guatemala border. In contrast, Shaun Kitchener wrote in the Metro that the show "is the heartfelt light we all need in these dark times" as it was aired during the COVID-19 pandemic. He noted that with the "masterful combination of escapism (the scenery!), warmth (the contestants!), drama (the conflict!) and adrenaline (the actual race!), Race Across The World is a merciful piece of TV to keep us briefly distracted over the next few weeks".

Awards and nominations
The first series of Race Across the World won the 2020 BAFTA TV Award in the Best Reality and Constructed Factual category. The second series was also nominated.

International broadcast
The programme aired in Australia on the Nine Network in December 2019. In the United States, the series became available on Discovery+ at launch in January 2021.

In Hong Kong, the first series aired on RTHK TV 31 as Race to Singapore (鬥快去星洲) from 6 April 2020, while the second series, aired from 5 October 2020 within the Let’s Explore hour with the sub-title translated as Race to South America (一齊闖天下:鬥快去南美).

Danish version
Danish TV 2 produced the first international adaptation named Først til verdens ende (translation: "First to the end of the world") in Autumn 2019 with a route between Odense and Singapore. The series began airing on 31 March 2020.

In April 2021, TV2 and production company Strong began casting for a second season with an expected filming period from 10 October until the end of November 2021. The season premiered on 11 April 2022 and saw contestants travelling in a circle around Europe to arrive back in Denmark. During the production, two participants tested positive for COVID-19, causing the competition to come to a halt for 11 days and participants being transported to the next checkpoint, before continuing.

On 23 May 2022, a third season was announced with casting starting the same day. Applicants were informed that they should be able to take time off for 52 days. The season will be filmed from 21 October until 11 December 2022 with broadcast expected the following year.

Other versions
In August 2021, it was revealed that Germany's RTL Zwei was preparing an adaptation of the format for the German audience.

A Dutch version of the show was filmed in Latin America. Presented by Martijn Krabbé, it began airing on 15 March 2023.

See also
The Amazing Race 
Race Around the World (Australia)
Race the World (China)
Lost (UK 2001)
Peking Express

References

External links

2019 British television series debuts
2010s British reality television series
2010s British documentary television series
2010s British travel television series
2020s British reality television series
2020s British documentary television series
2020s British travel television series
BBC television documentaries
BBC reality television shows
BBC travel television series
English-language television shows
Television series by All3Media